Arkansas Business Publishing Group is a magazine and newspaper publisher based in Little Rock, Arkansas, United States. The company produces a variety of annual, biannual, monthly and weekly publications for various niche audiences in the state, including flagship business weekly newspaper Arkansas Business launched in 1984, monthly Little Rock Family and monthly fashion and philanthropy magazine Little Rock Soirée.

The company has a web design and development division, FLEX360 Web Development, formed in 2003.

Arkansas Business
Since 1988, Arkansas Business has hosted a yearly awards ceremony honoring Arkansas businesses. The Arkansas Business of the Year awards are given for six categories: businesses with 1–25 employees, businesses for 26–75 employees, businesses with 76–300 employees, business executive of the year, nonprofit organization and nonprofit executive of the year.

Selected publications
 Arkansas Bride, biannual
 Arkansas Business, weekly
 Arkansas Green Guide, annual
 Arkansas Next: A Guide to Life After High School, annual
 Book of Lists, annual
 Greenhead, annual
 Hot Springs Guest Guide, annual
 Lease Guide, annual
 Little Rock Beauty Black Book, annual
 Little Rock Family, monthly
 Little Rock Guest Guide, annual
 Little Rock Soirée, monthly
 Living in Arkansas, annual
 Meeting Planner, annual
 Metro Little Rock Guide, annual

References

 The Alliance of Area Business Publications
 Parenting Publications of America
 FLEX360 in Fortune Small Business

External links
 Arkansas Business official website
 Arkansas Business Publishing Group website
 FLEX360 Web Development website
 Little Rock Family official website
 Little Rock Soiree official website
 Arkansas Bride official website

Companies based in Arkansas
Companies based in Little Rock, Arkansas